Alma Moreno  is a Filipina actress and politician.

Moreno appeared in her first film in Babalik Ka Rin. Ligaw Na Bulaklak was her first starring role with Vic Silayan. Ligaw Na Bulaklak was her breakout film. From that point until the late 1980s, Moreno was featured in various uncovering films that were film industry hits, acquiring her the title "Sex Goddess of Philippine Movies" of the 1970s and 1980s. Adaptable for having featured in comedy, sexy, and drama, she also was a presenter on a few variety shows during the 1980s for which she acquired the title "Shining Star".

In the mid-2000s, Moreno partitioned her time between her expert responsibilities with Habang Kapiling Ka's GMA and situational comedy program Da Boy en Da Girl. She offset these with her own duty to help the ladies and the poor in Parañaque City through different socio-metro and network improvement ventures. In 2002, she starred in her rebound film Kapalit.

Filmography

Dramas

Films

References 

Actress filmographies
Philippine filmographies